Bernhard Borgmann Jr. (November 22, 1898 – November 11, 1978) was a professional basketball player and coach.

Born in Haledon, New Jersey, he played for 17 years between 1919 and 1936, and is mostly known for his time with the Kingston Colonials and Original Celtics. Borgmann is regarded as the best offensive player of his era, leading various leagues in scoring 15 times in a 12-year span.  He also served as the first coach of the Syracuse Nationals of the National Basketball League—now the NBA's Philadelphia 76ers—from 1946 to 1948.  He was inducted into the Naismith Memorial Basketball Hall of Fame in 1961.

Borgmann also played as a middle infielder in the baseball minor leagues from 1928 to 1942, managed in the minors from until 1950, and scouted until 1974.  He died in Hawthorne, New Jersey, where he had been a longtime resident.

Borgmann was featured in the book Basketball History in Syracuse, Hoops Roots by Mark Allen Baker, published by The History Press in 2010.

References

External links
 Basketball Hall of Fame profile

1898 births
1978 deaths
Allentown Wings players
American Basketball League (1925–1955) coaches
Baseball infielders
Baseball players from New Jersey
Basketball coaches from New Jersey
Basketball players from New Jersey
Chicago Bruins players
College men's basketball head coaches in the United States
Clifton High School (New Jersey) alumni
Fort Wayne Hoosiers (basketball) players
Guards (basketball)
Houston Buffaloes managers
Huntington Red Birds players
Minnesota Twins scouts
Muhlenberg Mules men's basketball coaches
Naismith Memorial Basketball Hall of Fame inductees
Oakland Athletics scouts
Original Celtics players
Paterson Crescents players
People from Haledon, New Jersey
People from Hawthorne, New Jersey
Player-coaches
Portsmouth Red Birds players
Rochester Red Wings managers
Rochester Red Wings players
Sacramento Solons managers
Sacramento Solons players
Saint Michael's Purple Knights men's basketball coaches
Sportspeople from Passaic County, New Jersey
St. Louis Cardinals scouts
Syracuse Chiefs managers
Syracuse Chiefs players